Ronald Mallon is an American Professor of Philosophy and Director of the Philosophy-Neuroscience-Psychology Program at Washington University in St. Louis.

Work
Mallon's work is in philosophy of psychology, experimental philosophy, moral psychology, and critical race theory. He is an expert on human kinds, especially race, and how small inequalities can lead to big ones.

Bibliography
 Mallon, R. (2012). (with F. Allhoff and S. Nichols). An Introduction to Philosophy: Traditional and Experimental Readings.  Oxford University Press.
 Mallon, R. (2016). The Construction of Human Kinds. Oxford University Press.

References

Living people
Year of birth missing (living people)
Place of birth missing (living people)
Washington University in St. Louis faculty
21st-century American philosophers